Desmond Michael Patrick "Desse" Roche (February 1, 1909 – January 18, 1971) was a Canadian ice hockey player. He played four seasons in the National Hockey League for the Maroons, Senators, Eagles, Canadiens and Red Wings. He was one of only six NHL players to have worn the number 99. His brother Earl Roche also played in the National Hockey League. Roche scored the final goal of the original Ottawa Senators franchise on March 17, 1934, to tie the Maroons 2–2 in Montreal.

Playing career
Born in Kemptville, Ontario, Roche moved to Montreal, Quebec as a youth. He played junior for the Montreal Victorias, and played for other teams in the local railway league. In 1929, he joined the Montreal Hockey Club, and, with his brother Earl, the team won the Allan Cup. He signed in the fall of 1930 with the Maroons, playing with the Maroons and the minor-league Windsor Bulldogs until 1933, when he was traded to the Senators for Wally Kilrea. At the same time, the Senators acquired his brother Earl, and the two played with the Senators NHL franchise until 1934 when it relocated to St. Louis to become the Eagles. Playing with his brother, Roche had his best season in 1933–34 with 14 goals and 10 assists in 46 games. He was traded to Boston in December 1934 by the Eagles; he was then traded by the Bruins to the Canadiens four days later. That season, 1934–35, Roche played for six pro teams; the three in the NHL and three minor-league teams. He did not play in the NHL again; he continued in the minor leagues until 1939.

Career statistics

Regular season and playoffs

References

External links

1909 births
1971 deaths
Buffalo Bisons (IHL) players
Canadian ice hockey right wingers
Cleveland Falcons players
Detroit Olympics (IHL) players
Detroit Red Wings players
Ice hockey people from Ontario
Ice hockey people from Montreal
London Tecumsehs players
Montreal Canadiens players
Montreal Maroons players
Ottawa Senators (1917) players
Ottawa Senators (original) players
People from Leeds and Grenville United Counties
Pittsburgh Shamrocks players
St. Louis Eagles players
Windsor Bulldogs (1929–1936) players